The Guanshan Riverside Park is a park along the Keelung River in Songshan District of Taipei, Taiwan.

Geology
The park spans over an area of 27.22 hectares. The park is equipped with water supply facilities.

Transportation
The park is accessible within walking distance south of Gangqian Station of Taipei Metro.

See also
 List of parks in Taiwan
 Yingfeng Riverside Park
 Guanshan Waterfront Park

References

Parks in Taipei